The Toronto Blue Jays are a Major League Baseball (MLB) franchise based in Toronto, Ontario, Canada. They play in the American League East division. Since the Blue Jays' entrance into the league in 1977, the Blue Jays have selected 72 players in the first round. Officially known as the "First-Year Player Draft", the Rule 4 draft is MLB's primary mechanism for assigning amateur players from high schools, colleges, and other amateur clubs to its teams. The draft order is determined based on the previous season's standings, with the team possessing the worst record receiving the first pick. In addition, teams which lost free agents in the previous off-season may be awarded compensatory or supplementary picks. The First-Year Player Draft is unrelated to the 1976 expansion draft in which the Blue Jays initially filled their roster.

Of the 72 players picked in the first round by Toronto, 35 have been pitchers, the most of any position; 26 of them were right-handed, while nine were left-handed. 14 shortstops, 12 outfielders, four catchers and third basemen, and three first basemen have also been selected. The team has never drafted a player at second base in the first round. 38 players were drafted out of high school, while 31 came from four-year college programs and two from junior colleges. They have also drafted two players from Puerto Rico: Alex Ríos (1999) and Miguel Negrón (2000).

Ed Sprague Jr. (1988), who was with the franchise when they won the World Series in 1992 and 1993, is the only pick to win a championship with the team. No picks have won the MLB Rookie of the Year Award, though Shawn Green (1991) and Alex Ríos (1999) finished fifth in the voting in 1995 and 2004, respectively. Roy Halladay (1995) is the only first-round pick of the Blue Jays to be inducted into the Baseball Hall of Fame, occurring in 2019, and to earn a Cy Young Award with the team, winning in 2003. Jay Schroeder (1979) was drafted as a catcher, but ended up becoming a quarterback for ten years in the National Football League.

The Blue Jays have made 23 selections in the supplemental round of the draft and 31 compensatory picks since their entry into the league in 1977. These additional picks are provided when a team loses a particularly valuable free agent in the previous off-season, or, more recently, if a team fails to sign a draft pick from the previous year. The Blue Jays have failed to sign three of their first-round picks, James Paxton (2009), who opted to return to the University of Kentucky, Tyler Beede (2011), and Phil Bickford (2013). The Blue Jays received the 38th pick in 2010, the 22nd pick in 2012, and the 11th pick in 2015 as compensation.

Key

Picks

See also
Toronto Blue Jays minor league players

Footnotes
 Through the 2012 draft, free agents were evaluated by the Elias Sports Bureau and rated "Type A", "Type B", or not compensation-eligible. If a team offered arbitration to a player but that player refused and subsequently signed with another team, the original team was able to receive additional draft picks. If a "Type A" free agent left in this way, his previous team received a supplemental pick and a compensatory pick from the team with which he signed. If a "Type B" free agent left in this way, his previous team received only a supplemental pick. Since the 2013 draft, free agents are no longer classified by type; instead, compensatory picks are only awarded if the team offered its free agent a contract worth at least the average of the 125 current richest MLB contracts. However, if the free agent's last team acquired the player in a trade during the last year of his contract, it is ineligible to receive compensatory picks for that player.
 The Blue Jays gained a compensatory first-round pick in 1981 from the Milwaukee Brewers for losing free agent Roy Howell.
 The Blue Jays lost their first-round pick in 1984 to the Chicago White Sox as compensation for signing free agent Dennis Lamp.
 The Blue Jays gained a compensatory first-round pick in 1991 from the San Francisco Giants for losing free agent Bud Black.
 The Blue Jays gained a supplemental first-round pick in 1991 for losing free agent George Bell.
 The Blue Jays gained a supplemental first-round pick in 1991 for losing free agent Bud Black.
 The Blue Jays gained a compensatory first-round pick in 1992 from the Los Angeles Dodgers for losing free agent Tom Candiotti.
 The Blue Jays gained a supplemental first-round pick in 1992 for losing free agent Tom Candiotti.
 The Blue Jays gained a compensatory first-round pick in 1993 from the Texas Rangers for losing free agent Tom Henke.
 The Blue Jays gained a supplemental first-round pick in 1993 for losing free agent David Cone.
 The Blue Jays gained a supplemental first-round pick in 1993 for losing free agent Tom Henke.
 The Blue Jays gained a supplemental first-round pick in 1993 for losing free agent Jimmy Key.
 The Blue Jays gained a compensatory first-round pick in 1996 from the Baltimore Orioles for losing free agent Roberto Alomar.
 The Blue Jays gained a supplemental first-round pick in 1996 for losing free agent Roberto Alomar.
 The Blue Jays gained a supplemental first-round pick in 2000 for losing free agent Graeme Lloyd.
 The Blue Jays gained a supplemental first-round pick in 2004 for losing free agent Kelvim Escobar.
 The Blue Jays gained a compensatory first-round pick in 2007 from the Texas Rangers for losing free agent Frank Catalanotto.
 The Blue Jays gained a supplemental first-round pick in 2007 for losing free agent Justin Speier.
 The Blue Jays gained a supplemental first-round pick in 2007 for losing free agent Frank Catalanotto.
 The Blue Jays gained a supplemental first-round pick in 2007 for losing free agent Ted Lilly.
 The Blue Jays gained a supplemental first-round pick in 2009 for losing free agent A. J. Burnett.
 The Blue Jays gained a supplemental first-round pick in 2010 for losing free agent Marco Scutaro.
 The Blue Jays gained a supplemental first-round pick in 2010 for failing to sign draft pick James Paxton.
 The Blue Jays gained a supplemental first-round pick in 2010 for losing free agent Rod Barajas.
 The Blue Jays gained a supplemental first-round pick in 2011 for losing free agent Scott Downs.
 The Blue Jays gained a supplemental first-round pick in 2011 for losing free agent John Buck.
 The Blue Jays gained a supplemental first-round pick in 2011 for losing free agent Kevin Gregg.
 The Blue Jays gained a supplemental first-round pick in 2011 for losing free agent Miguel Olivo.
 The Blue Jays gained a compensatory first-round pick in 2012 for failing to sign draft pick Tyler Beede.
 The Blue Jays gained a supplemental first-round pick in 2012 for losing free agent Frank Francisco.
 The Blue Jays gained a supplemental first-round pick in 2012 for losing free agent Jon Rauch.
 The Blue Jays gained a supplemental first-round pick in 2012 for losing free agent José Molina.
 The Blue Jays gained a compensatory first-round pick in 2014 for failing to sign draft pick Phil Bickford.
 The Blue Jays gained a supplemental first-round pick in 2017 for losing free agent Edwin Encarnación.

References
General references

In-text citations

First-round draft picks
Toronto Blue Jays first-round draft picks